Diocese of Bethlehem may refer to the following ecclesiastical jurisdictions :

 Latin Catholic bishoprics 
 Roman Catholic Diocese of Bethlehem in the Holy Land, a former Latin crusader bishopric, now a Latin Catholic titular see
 Roman Catholic Diocese of Bethléem à Clamecy, for the bishops of above Bethlehem in exile from the Holy land, with see in Clamecy, Burgundy (eastern France)
 Roman Catholic Diocese of Bethlehem in South Africa

Episcopal (Anglican) diocese 
 Episcopal Diocese of Bethlehem, formerly known as the Diocese of Central Pennsylvania (USA)